GodEngine is an original 1996 novel written by Craig Hinton based on the long-running British science fiction television series Doctor Who. It features the Seventh Doctor, Chris, Roz, the Ice Warriors and the Daleks.

1996 British novels
1996 science fiction novels
Virgin New Adventures
Novels by Craig Hinton
Novels set on Mars
Seventh Doctor novels
Novels set in the 22nd century